2.0 typically refers to the second version of a computer program; see software versioning.

2.0 may also refer to:

Film and television
 2.0 (film), a 2018 Indian film sequel to Enthiran (2010)
 "2.0" (Nikita), a 2010 episode of Nikita

Music
 2.0 (98 Degrees album), 2013
 2.0 (Big Data album), 2015
 2.0 (EP), a 2015 EP by La-Ventura
 2.0 (Citizen Way album), 2016
 2.0 (JLS album), 2021

Other uses
 2point0, a professional wrestling tag team, also known as 2.0
 Stereophonic sound, two channel audio, sometimes notated 2.0
 2, a natural number

See also